A calcium spark is the microscopic release of calcium (Ca2+) from a store known as the sarcoplasmic reticulum (SR), located within muscle cells. This release occurs through an ion channel within the membrane of the SR, known as a ryanodine receptor (RyR), which opens upon activation. This process is important as it helps to maintain Ca2+ concentration within the cell. It also initiates muscle contraction in skeletal and cardiac muscles and muscle relaxation in smooth muscles. Ca2+ sparks are important in physiology as they show how Ca2+ can be used at a subcellular level, to signal both local changes, known as local control, as well as whole cell changes.

Activation
As mentioned above, Ca2+ sparks depend on the opening of ryanodine receptors, of which there are three types:
 Type 1 – found mainly in skeletal muscle 
 Type 2 – found mainly in the heart 
 Type 3 – found mainly in the brain 
Opening of the channel allows Ca2+ to pass from the SR, into the cell. This increases the local Ca2+ concentration around the RyR, by a factor of 10. Calcium sparks can either be evoked or spontaneous, as described below.

Evoked
Electrical impulses, known as action potentials, travel along the cell membrane (sarcolemma) of muscle cells.  Located in the sarcolemma of smooth muscle cells are receptors, called dihydropyridine receptors (DHPR). In skeletal and cardiac muscle cells, however, these receptors are located within structures known as T-tubules, that are extensions of the plasma membrane penetrating deep into the cell (see figure 1). These DHPRs are located directly opposite to the ryanodine receptors, located on the sarcoplasmic reticulum and activation, by the action potential causes the DHPRs to change shape.

In cardiac and smooth muscle, activation of the DHPR  results in it forming an ion channel. This allows Ca2+ to pass into the cell, increasing the local Ca2+ concentration, around the RyR. When four Ca2+ molecules bind to the RyR, it opens, resulting in a larger release of Ca2+, from the SR . This process, of using Ca2+ to activate release of Ca2+ from the SR is known as calcium-induced calcium release.

However, in skeletal muscle the DHPR touches the RyR. Therefore, the shape change of the DHPR activates the RyR directly, without the need for Ca2+ to flood into the cell first. This causes the RyR to open, allowing Ca2+ to be released from the SR.

Spontaneous 
Ca2+ sparks can also occur in cells at rest (i.e. cells that have not been stimulated by an action potential). This occurs roughly 100 times every second in each cell and is a result of Ca2+ concentration being too high. An increase in Ca2+ within the SR is thought to bind to Ca2+ sensitive sites on the inside of the RyR causing the channel to open. As well as this, a protein called calsequestrin (found within the SR) detaches from the RyR, when calcium concentration is too high, again allowing the channel to open (see sarcoplasmic reticulum for more details). Similarly, a decrease in Ca2+ concentration within the SR has also proven to lower RyR sensitivity. This is thought to be due to the calsequestrin binding more strongly to the RyR, preventing it from opening and decreasing the likelihood of a spontaneous spark.

Calcium after release 
There are roughly 10,000 clusters of ryanodine receptors within a single cardiac cell, with each cluster containing around 100 ryanodine receptors. During a single spontaneous spark, when Ca2+ is released from the SR, the Ca2+ diffuses throughout the cell. As the RyRs in the heart are activated by Ca2+, the movement of the Ca2+ released during a spontaneous spark, can activate other neighbouring RyRs within the same cluster. However, there usually isn't enough Ca2+ present in a single spark to reach a neighbouring cluster of receptors. The calcium can, however, signal back to the DHPR causing it to close and preventing further influx of calcium. This is known as negative feedback.

An increase in Ca2+ concentration within the cell or the production of a larger spark, can lead to a large enough calcium released that the neighbouring cluster can be activated by the first. This is known as spark-induced spark activation and can lead to a Ca2+ wave of calcium release spreading across the cell.

During evoked Ca2+ sparks, all clusters of ryanodine receptors, throughout the cell are activated at almost exactly the same time. This produces an increase in Ca2+ concentration across the whole cell (not just locally) and is known as a whole cell Ca2+ transient. This Ca2+ then binds to a protein, called troponin, initiating contraction, through a group of proteins known as myofilaments.

In smooth muscle cells, the Ca2+ released during a spark is used for muscle relaxation. This is because, the Ca2+ that enters the cell via the DHPR in response to the action potential, stimulates both muscle contraction and calcium release from the SR. The Ca2+ released during the spark, then activates two other ion channels on the membrane. One channel allows potassium ions to exit the cell, whereas the other allows chloride ions to leave the cell. The result of this movement of ions, is that the membrane voltage becomes more negative. This deactivates the DHPR (which was activated by the positive membrane potential produced by the action potential), causing it to close and stopping the flow of Ca2+into the cell, leading to relaxation.

Termination
The mechanism by which SR Ca2+ release terminates is still not fully understood. Current main theories are outlined below:

Local depletion of SR Ca2+
This theory suggests that during a calcium spark, as calcium flows out of the SR, the concentration of Ca2+ within the SR becomes too low. However, this was not thought to be the case for spontaneous sparks as the total release during a Ca2+ spark is small compared to total SR Ca2+ content and researchers have produced sparks lasting longer than 200 milliseconds, therefore showing that there is still enough Ca2+  left within the SR after a 'normal' (200ms) spark. However local depletion in the junctional SR may be much larger than previously thought (see ). During the activation of a large number of ryanodine receptors however, as is the case during electrically evoked Ca2+ release , the entire SR is about 50% depleted of Ca2+ and this mechanism will play an important role in repriming of release.

Stochastic attrition
Despite the complicated name, this idea simply suggests that all ryanodine receptors in a cluster, and the associated dihydropyridine receptors happen to randomly close at the same time. This would not only prevent calcium release from the SR, but it would also stop the stimulus for calcium release (i.e. the flow of calcium through the DHPR). However, due to the large numbers of RyRs and DHPRs in a single cell, this theory seems to be unrealistic, as there is a very small probability that they would all close together at exactly the same time.

Inactivation/adaptation
This theory suggests that after activation of the RyR and the subsequent release of Ca2+, the channel closes briefly to recover. During this time, either the channel cannot be reopened, even if calcium is present (i.e. the RyR is inactivated) or the channel can be reopened, however more calcium is required to activate it than usual (i.e. the RyR is in an adaptation phase). This would mean that one-by-one the RyRs would close, thus ending the spark.

Sticky cluster theory 
This theory suggests that the above three theories all play a role in preventing calcium release.

Discovery
Spontaneous Ca2+ sparks were discovered in  cardiac muscle cells, of rats, in 1992 by Peace Cheng and Mark B. Cannell in Jon Lederer's laboratory at the University of Maryland, Baltimore, U.S.A.

Initially the idea was rejected by the scientific journal, Nature, who believed that the sparks were only present under laboratory conditions (i.e. they were artifacts), and so wouldn't  occur naturally within the body. However they were quickly recognised as being of fundamental importance to muscle physiology, playing a huge role in excitation-contraction coupling.

The discovery was made possible due to improvements in confocal microscopes. This allowed for the detection of the release of Ca2+, which were highlighted using a substance known as fluo-3, which caused the Ca2+ to glow. Ca2+ “sparks” were so called because of the spontaneous, localised nature of the Ca2+ release as well as the fact that they are the initiation event of excitation-contraction coupling.

Detection and analysis
Because of the importance of Ca2+ sparks in explaining the gating properties of ryanodine receptors in situ (within the body), many studies have focused on improving their detectability  in the hope that by accurately and reliably detecting all Ca2+ spark  events, their true properties can finally help us to answer the unsolved mystery of spark termination.

See also
Calcium-induced calcium release
Confocal microscopy
Ryanodine receptor

References

External links
Software
 SparkMaster - Automated Ca2+ Spark Analysis with ImageJ - Free software for Ca2+ spark analysis in confocal linescan images

Cell biology